is a song by Japanese rock band Kana-Boon. It was released as the band's fifth major-label single, released on November 26, 2014 through Ki/oon Music. The single placed 11th on the Oricon charts. "Silhouette" was used as the sixteenth opening theme song for the anime television series Naruto: Shippuden.

Release and reception
On September 8, 2014, the 41st issue of the 2014 release of Weekly Shōnen Jump announced that Kana-Boon would be performing the sixteenth opening theme for Naruto Shippuden. The single was released on November 26, 2014, with a standard edition and a limited edition release. The limited edition release included a DVD containing the recordings of nine songs, a clear folder, and a 2015 calendar. The song was later performed live on The First Take with Takahiro Yamada from Asian Kung-Fu Generation.

The single reached number 11 on the Oricon charts, and reached 2 on the Japan Hot 100 and Japan Hot Animation charts. The single also achieved Platinum certification in August 2018 by the Recording Industry Association of Japan in August 2018, for 250,000 music downloads.

Music video
The music video for "Silhouette" is directed by Sōjirō Kamatani, and features actor Hiroki Nakajima. Nakajima is seen in the rain, with shots of the band playing in a room with various artworks occurring throughout the video, and another shot of lead singer Maguro Taniguchi wearing an Asian conical hat whilst performing in a room in front of calligraphy and beside ornaments. Nakajima begins to run whilst in the rain before tripping over. Nakajima later stands and runs whilst screaming, before stopping and spinning in a parking lot. He later falls over whilst spinning around, lying on the ground and facing the sky. Montages of Nakajima, Kana-Boon, and Taniguchi continue throughout the video. As of February 2023, the music video on YouTube has reached over 251 million views with 2.8million likes.

Track listing

Charts

Release history

References

External links
 

2014 singles
2014 songs
Kana-Boon songs
Ki/oon Music singles
Naruto songs